The National Farm Workers Association Headquarters in Delano, California, also known as Iglesia Pentecostal La Nueva Jerusalem, was listed on the National Register of Historic Places in 2015.

It is significant for its historic use as a union hall starting on September 26, 1964.  It was the starting point of the National Farm Workers Association's protest march starting on March 17, 1966, in Delano and ending on April 10 in California's capital Sacramento.

In 2015 it was in use as a church.

See also
The Forty Acres, also NRHP-listed in Delano

References

National Register of Historic Places in Kern County, California
Mission Revival architecture in California
Buildings and structures completed in 1968
Buildings and structures in Kern County, California
Buildings and structures on the National Register of Historic Places in California
United Farm Workers